Oculo-respiratory syndrome (ORS) is a usually transient condition characterized by bilateral conjunctivitis, facial edema, and upper respiratory symptoms following influenza immunization.  Symptoms typically appear 2 to 24 hours after vaccination and resolve within 48 hours of onset.

References
 

http://cvi.asm.org/content/early/2013/05/16/CVI.00659-12.abstract    Copyright © 2013, American Society for Microbiology. All Rights Reserved.

Influenza vaccines
Syndromes